The Russian Social Democratic Party of Estonia was a social democratic political party in Estonia (then the Estonian SSR). On September 8, 1989, the party merged into the Estonian Social Democratic Party.

References

1989 disestablishments in Estonia
Defunct political parties in Estonia
Political parties disestablished in 1989
Russian political parties in Estonia
Social democratic parties in the Soviet Union
Socialist parties in Estonia